Nội Bài International Airport  in Hanoi, the capital of Vietnam, is the second largest and busiest airport for passenger traffic, after Tan Son Nhat International Airport. It is currently the main airport serving Hanoi, replacing the role of Gia Lam Airport. The airport consists of two passenger terminals. Terminal 1 serves domestic flights, and the newly built Terminal 2 (inaugurated on 4 January 2015) serves all international flights to and from Hanoi. The airport is currently the main hub of the flag carrier Vietnam Airlines, travel carrier Vietravel Airlines, and budget carriers Bamboo Airways, Pacific Airlines and Vietjet Air.

The airport is located in Phu Minh Commune in Sóc Sơn District, about 35 kilometres (21 miles) northeast of downtown Hanoi, via the new Nhật Tân Bridge (also inaugurated on 4 January 2015). It can also be reached by National Road 3, which connects it with the eastern suburbs of Hanoi. The airport is also close to some satellite cities of Hanoi such as Vĩnh Yên, Bắc Ninh and Thái Nguyên.
The airport served a total of 13 million passengers in 2013, despite having a capacity of only 9 million at the time. The new international terminal, which had its first commercial flight on 25 December 2014 and went into full operation on 31 December 2014, has boosted the airport's total capacity to 20 million passengers per year. In 2018, the airport served 28 million passengers.
The airport's IATA code, HAN, is derived from the city's current name of Hanoi .

Of the routes the airport offers, the Hanoi – Ho Chi Minh City route is the busiest in Southeast Asia and the sixth busiest in the world, serving 6,867,114 customers in 2018.

History
The airport was developed immediately south of the Phúc Yên Air Base and opened on 2 January 1978. The terminal 1 building was completed and became operational in 2001.

In 2005, Tiger Airways started thrice-weekly flights between Hanoi and Singapore after launching direct flights between Hồ Chí Minh City and Singapore becoming the first budget airline to operate in Vietnam. It was later joined by low-cost carrier AirAsia when they launched direct flights between Hanoi and Bangkok and Kuala Lumpur.

The second runway (1B – 11R/29L) opened in 2006 and the following year the airport hosted an Airbus A380 for the first time, although no scheduled A380 services are operated from the airport. 2013 saw the first arrival of a Cargolux Boeing 747-8F. In 2014 the airport received its first scheduled service with the newest generation of commercial aircraft when All Nippon Airways started using a Boeing 787-8 on services between to Tokyo–Haneda and later the same year the airport received its first visit of Airbus A350 XWB operated by Airbus on World Tour trip. In 2015, Vietnam Airlines started to operate the Airbus A350 XWB for commercial domestic flights.

The airport has been a SkyTeam hub since mid-2010, after Vietnam Airlines joined the network that year.

Terminals and facilities
At 650 hectares, Noi Bai is the second-largest airport in Vietnam, behind the 800 hectare Tan Son Nhat International Airport. Terminal 1, completed in 2001, had one main section for international flights with a new terminal extension (denoted Lobby E) for domestic flights, which was completed in late 2013. Together with the extension, terminal 1 is capable of handling 9 million passengers per annum. Following the inauguration of Terminal 2 in January 2015, Terminal 1 is solely used for domestic flights. The terminal is currently being upgraded to handle 15 million passengers annually upon completion in March 2018.

The construction of the new terminal (Terminal 2) next to the existing one with a designed capacity of 10 million passengers per annum started in March 2012. The 996 m long new terminal building, funded by a Japan International Cooperation Agency ODA loan was designed by Japan Airport Consultants and was built by Taisei Corporation. The total investment for the project was ¥75.5 billion (US$645.35 million). Japan's official development assistance accounted for ¥59 billion ($504.27 million) of the investment, while the remaining amount was covered by local funds. The new international terminal was inaugurated on 4 January 2015 together with a new freeway connecting the airport to downtown Hanoi via the Nhật Tân Bridge.

The airport has a 3,800-meter paved runway (CAT II – 11R/29L) which opened in August 2006 and an older 3,200-meter paved runway (CAT I – 11L/29R). The older runway was closed for upgrades for 4 months from August to December 2014. The distance between the two runways is only 250 metres, so the airport currently restricts the maximum passenger capacity in accordance with International Civil Aviation Organization safety regulations.

The AMAN/DMAN system was implemented at the airport in October 2021 to manage and arrange the shortest flight trajectory of each flight, allowing to increased passenger capacity and airspace operations.

Awards

Following the inauguration of the new international terminal, the Noi Bai International Airport received the World's Most Improved Airport Award from Skytrax.

The construction project of the new Noi Bai international terminal also received the JICA President Award for 2015.

Transit
One can generally do an international transit through the airport without a visa as long as one does not need to leave the security area. There is the ability to pick up board passes within the security area including for some low cost airlines like VietJet.

Airlines and destinations

Passenger

Cargo

Ground transportation
The future line 6 of Hanoi Metro is planned to be extended to the airport.

Statistics

Gallery

See also

 Da Nang International Airport
 Phu Quoc International Airport
 Tan Son Nhat International Airport
 List of airports in Vietnam

References

External links

 Noi Bai Airport Transfer Service

Airports established in 1978
Airports in Vietnam
Buildings and structures in Hanoi
Transport in Hanoi
1978 establishments in Vietnam